is a Japanese former water polo player who competed in the 1972 Summer Olympics.

References

External links

1935 births
Living people
Japanese male water polo players
Olympic water polo players of Japan
Water polo players at the 1972 Summer Olympics
Place of birth missing (living people)
20th-century Japanese people
21st-century Japanese people